Carlos Ramón Aránguiz Zúñiga (18 September 1953 – 3 January 2021) was a Chilean judge who served on the Supreme Court.

References

1953 births
2021 deaths
20th-century Chilean judges
21st-century Chilean judges